The 1502d Air Transport Wing is a discontinued United States Air Force unit, last assigned to Western Transport Air Force in January 1966.  The 1502d ATW was a heavy cargo transport wing of the Military Air Transport Service (MATS), formed at Hickam AFB on 1 July 1955.

History
The wing was organized in mid-1955 with five C-97 squadrons established; squadrons again redesignated as part of the Wing realignment.   In 1955 two squadrons were upgraded to very heavy lift C-124 Globemaster II which gave the wing a worldwide airlift capability.   Also beginning in 1955, the wing operated VC-97s for VIP/Special Air Mission flights supporting HQ Far East Air Force (Rear). later HQ Pacific Air Forces, 1957–1966.

The 1502nd Air Transport Wing Rodeo team under the command of Major Joe Lodrige win the 1962 Military Air Transport Service Rodeo at Scott Air Force Base, Ill. The C-124 team from Hickam Air Force Base, Hawaii, devised a new airdrop system to use in that first active-duty Rodeo, which helped them claim the title of the "best of the best. Several members of the 1502nd including Major Lodrige, went on to very distinguished service flying in the elite 89th Airlift Wing stationed at Andrews Air Force Base flying our nation's most senior civilian and military leaders to locations around the globe.

The wing assumed responsibility for aircraft and personnel of 1503d Air Transport Group at Tachikawa Air Base, Japan in 1964 when 1503d reduced from Wing to Group level.  The 1503d was a support organization and had no flying units assigned despite its name.  The wing remained flying worldwide transport missions with the Globemasters until 1966 when MATS was inactivated and the wing assets were transferred to the Military Airlift Command 61st Military Airlift Wing.

Major airlifts
 During the Taiwan Strait crisis of 1958, MATS flew 144 airlift trips to the Far East when the crisis arose in the Formosa Straits, supporting the move of a Tactical Air Command Composite Air Strike Force, and airlifting a squadron of F-104 Starfighters to Taiwan.
 MATS supported nuclear weapons testing at the Eniwetok Proving Ground by airlifting more than 14,000 tons of cargo and 13,000 personnel, as well as providing 1,100 of its own technical personnel.
 In February 1961, MATS participated in Long Pass, the first strategic deployment airlift exercise of its size to the Pacific. It used 132 aircraft to move a battle group of the Strategic Army Corps (STRAC) and equipment for a Tactical Air Command Composite Strike Force (CASF) to Clark Air Base, the Philippines, and back again.
 In February 1962, MATS used 120 airlift aircraft of all types in a similar exercise, Great Shelf, to Clark Air Base. This time it moved 2,300 Army paratroops of STRAC and 1,100 tons of their equipment over the  route.
 In 1962, Devastating  winds of Typhoon Karen had barely subsided when the first of 50 MATS jet and prop-driven aircraft began landing on the rain-soaked runways of Anderson Air Force Base, Guam, with relief supplies and equipment. MATS airlifted more than 970 tons of material – from huge electric generators to blankets and clothing. Returning aircraft evacuated more than 760 dependents and servicemen whose homes had been shattered by the island's most severe storm in recorded history.

Lineage

1502d Air Transport Group
 Designated as the 531st Air Transport Group, 14 May 1948
 Organized 1 June 1948
 Redesignated as 1500th Air Transport Group, 1 October 1948
 Redesignated as 1502d Air Transport Group, 1 July 1955
 Discontinued 15 May 1958

1502d Air Transport Wing
 Designated and organized as the 1502d Air Transport Wing, 1 July 1955
 Discontinued on 8 January 1966, personnel and equipment assigned to 61st Military Airlift Wing

Assignments
 Pacific Division, MATS, 1 July 1955
 Western Transport Air Force, (WESTAF), 1 July 1958
 Headquarters, Military Air Transport Service, 1–8 Jan 1966

Components
Groups
 1502d Air Transport Group, 1 July 1955 – 15 May 1958
 1st Air Transport Squadron (later 1263d Air Transport Squadron), 1 June 1948 – 17 June 1949
 2d Air Transport Squadron (later 1264th Air Transport Squadron), 1 June 1948 – 1 June 1949
 4th Air Transport Squadron (later 1265th Air Transport Squadron), 1 June 1948 – 23 April 1949
 47th Air Transport Squadron, Medium, 20 Jul 1952 – 15 May 1958
 48th Air Transport Squadron, Heavy, 20 July 1952 – 15 May 1958
 49th Air Transport Squadron, Heavy, 20 July 1952 – 1 July 1955
 50th Air Transport Squadron, Heavy, 20 July 1952 – 15 May 1958
 51st Air Transport Squadron, 20 July 1952 – 1 July 1955
 1263d Air Transport Squadron, 30 June 1949 – 20 July 1952
 Elements deployed to Tachikawa Airfield, Japan during 1951–1952 flying combat resupply missions during Korean War
 1264th Air Transport Squadron, 13 October 1949 – 20 July 1952
 1266th Air Transport Squadron, 30 June 1949 – 20 July 1952
 1267th Air Transport Squadron, 13 October 1949 – 24 May 1950
 1268th Air Transport Squadron, 30 June 1949 – 20 July 1952
 1283d Air Transport Squadron, 24 Oct 1951 – 1 Jun 1952
 1284th Air Transport Squadron, 24 Oct 1951 – 1 Jun 1952
 1503d Air Transport Group, 22 June 1964 – 8 January 1966
 1503d Support Squadron (Transport), 22 June 1964 – 8 January 1966
 At Tachikawa Air Base, Japan

Squadrons
 6th Troop Carrier Squadron, 23 Jun 1965 – 8 Jan 1966
 48th Air Transport Squadron, 15 May 1958 – 25 June 1965
 50th Air Transport Squadron, 15 May 1958 – 8 January 1966
 1453d Aeromedical Evacuation Squadron, Sep 1956 – 1 November 1965
 1505th Support Squadron (Transport), 22 June 1964 – 8 January 1966
 at Kadena AB, Okinawa
 1506th Support Squadron (Transport), 22 June 1964 – 8 January 1966
 at Clark AB, Philippines
 1507th Support Squadron (Transport), 22 June 1964 – 8 January 1966
 at Andersen AFB, Guam
 1508th Support Squadron (Transport), 21 December 1965 – 8 January 1966
 at Cam Rahn Bay, Viet Nam
 Naval Air Transport Squadron 8 (VR-8), attached 1 July 1955 – 5 September 1957
 Naval Air Transport Squadron 7 (VR-7), attached 1 Jul 1955 – 15 Aug 1957

Stations
 Hickam Air Force Base, Hawaii, 1 July 1955 – 8 January 1966

Aircraft
 C-97 Stratofreighter
 47th, 48th, 49th, 50th, 51st Air Transport Squadrons, 1955
 Note: 50th ATS operated a VC-97 version of Stratofreighter, 1951–1966 for VIP/Special Air Missions.
 C-118 Liftmaster
 48th Air Transport Squadron, 195? -1965
 C-124 Globemaster II
 50th Air Transport Squadron, 1955–1966
 6th Troop Carrier Squadron, 1965–1966
 C-131 Samaritan
 1453d Medical (later Aeromedical) Air Evacuation Squadron, 1956–1965

References

 
 
   Air Force History Index.org, Individual squadron lookups in AFHRA archives
 
 Air Force Print News Today 

Four Digit Wings of the United States Air Force
Military units and formations established in 1955
Military units and formations disestablished in 1966
Air transport wings of the United States Air Force
1955 establishments in Hawaii
1966 disestablishments in Hawaii